The Pandora Papers are 11.9 million leaked documents with 2.9 terabytes of data that the International Consortium of Investigative Journalists (ICIJ) published  beginning on 3 October 2021. The leak  exposed the secret offshore accounts of 35 world leaders, including current and former presidents, prime ministers, and heads of state as well as more than 100 billionaires, celebrities, and business leaders. The news organizations of the ICIJ described the document leak as their most expansive exposé of financial secrecy yet, containing documents, images, emails and spreadsheets from 14 financial service companies, in nations including Panama, Switzerland and the United Arab Emirates, surpassing their previous release of the Panama Papers in 2016, which had 11.5 million confidential documents (2.6 terabytes). At the time of the release of the papers, the ICIJ said it is not identifying its source for the documents.

Estimates by the ICIJ of money held offshore (outside the country where the money was made) range from US$5.6 trillion to US$32 trillion.

Disclosures 

In total, 35 current and former national leaders appear in the leak, alongside 400 public officials from nearly 100 countries and more than 100 billionaires. As per laws of tax, some of the activities were legal but could not be justified. Some files were showing the date of 1970, but they were actually created between the years 1996 to 2020. The data included 130 billionaires listed by the Forbes, over 330 politicians, celebrities, members of the royal families and even some religious leaders. Among those names are former British prime minister Tony Blair, Chilean president Sebastián Piñera, former Kenyan president Uhuru Kenyatta, Montenegrin president Milo Đukanović, Ukrainian president Volodymyr Zelenskyy, Qatari emir Tamim bin Hamad Al Thani, United Arab Emirates prime minister and Dubai ruler Mohammed bin Rashid Al Maktoum, Gabonese president Ali Bongo Ondimba, Lebanese prime minister Najib Mikati, Ecuadorian president Guillermo Lasso, family members of former Argentine president Mauricio Macri and his spin-doctor, Ecuadorian Jaime Durán Barba, and Cypriot president Nicos Anastasiades. More than 100 billionaires, 29,000 offshore accounts, 30 current and former leaders, and 336 politicians were named in the first leaks on 3 October 2021.

King Abdullah II of Jordan is one of the main figures named in the papers, with documents showing he had invested over US$100 million in property across the UK and the US; they included houses in Malibu, California, Washington, D.C., London and Ascot. A UK company controlled by Cherie Blair was shown to have acquired a £6.45 million property in London by purchasing Romanstone International Limited, a British Virgin Islands company; had the property been acquired directly, £312,000 would have been payable in stamp duty. Tony Blair's name appears in a statement of joint income for the associated mortgage.

The papers also reveal how an office block owned by Azerbaijan's ruling Aliyev family was sold to the Crown Estate, the sovereign's public estate, for £66 million in 2018, netting the Aliyevs a £31 million profit. Another office block worth £33 million was sold to the family in 2009, and was gifted to the son of Azerbaijani president Ilham Aliyev, Heydar. According to Las Vegas Sun, "Members of the inner circle of Pakistani prime minister Imran Khan are accused of hiding millions of dollars in wealth in secret companies or trusts". Supporters of former Ukrainian president Petro Poroshenko accused his successor Zelensky, who came to power on an anti-corruption campaign, of tax evasion. Elsewhere, close associates of Russian president Vladimir Putin, like Svetlana Krivonogikh and Gennady Timchenko, were revealed to have secret assets in Monaco, and Czech prime minister Andrej Babiš, who had campaigned on promising to crack down on corruption and tax evasion, did not declare the use of an offshore investment company in the purchase of eight properties, including two villas, in Mougins on the French Riviera for £12 million. As a result of the Pandora Papers, more information emerged about Russia-linked, allegedly Kremlin-linked, donations to the Tories. Uhuru Kenyatta was also mentioned, despite being quoted in 2018 as stating, "Every public servant's assets must be declared publicly so that people can question and askwhat is legitimate?" Kenyatta and six members of his family have been linked to 13 offshore companies. The leaked list also includes transnational criminal organization leaders, such as Raffaele Amato, boss of the Amato-Pagano clan, a clan within the Camorra, dedicated to international drug trafficking. Amato used a shell company in the UK to buy land and real estate in Spain.

Other global names mentioned include Shakira, who was incorporating new offshore entities while going on trial for tax evasion; model Claudia Schiffer; Indian cricket player Sachin Tendulkar; Indian billionaire Anil Ambani; fugitive diamantaire Nirav Modi’s sister Purvi Modi; Alexandre Cazes, the founder of the dark web site AlphaBay, used to deal in illegal drugs; Pakistani finance minister, Shaukat Fayaz Ahmed Tarin, and several of family members of Pakistan's top generals; and the CEO of Channel One Russia, Konstantin Ernst. Miguel Bosé, Pep Guardiola and Julio Iglesias are also named.

Data sources 
The leaked files come from 14 offshore service providers that help clients establish companies in secrecy jurisdictions.

Alcogal law firm 
An ICIJ report focused on the Panamanian law firm of Alemán, Cordero, Galindo & Lee, or Alcogal, saying it was the "law firm of the Latin American elite", having created at least 14,000 shell companies and trusts in tax havens. Alcogal was thus mentioned more than any other offshore provider in the leaked documents.

Participating media outlets 
For the uncovering of the papers, the ICIJ worked with journalists from 91 media outlets in 117 countries including news organizations such as The Washington Post, L'Espresso, Le Monde, El País, Süddeutsche Zeitung, the PBS program Frontline, the Australian Broadcasting Corporation, The Guardian, and the BBC’s Panorama.

The following media organisations worked on the investigation:

  Balkan Investigative Reporting Network
  Twala
  La Nación
  elDiarioAR
  Infobae
  Hetq
  Australian Broadcasting Corporation
  Australian Financial Review
  Austrian Broadcasting Corporation
  Profil
  Belsat
  De Tijd
  Knack
  Le Soir
  Organized Crime and Corruption Reporting Project
  Ink Center for Investigative Journalism
  Agência Pública
  Metrópoles
  Poder 360
  Revista Piauí
  Bureau for Investigative Reporting and Data 
  L’Economiste Du Faso
  VOD
  The Museba Project
  CBC/Radio-Canada
  Toronto Star
  Ciper Chile
  Fundación Periodística LaBot
  CONNECTAS
  El Espectador
  National Magazine Comores
  Centro Latinoamericano de Investigación Periodística
  Costa Rica Noticias, Canal 13
  Eburnie Today
  L’Elephant Dechaine
  Proyecto Inventario
  Czech Center for Investigative Journalism
  Berlingske
  Danish Broadcasting Corporation
  Politiken
  Noticias SIN
  Diario El Universo
  Mada Masr
  El Faro
  Diario Rombe
  Eesti Päevaleht
  Yle – Finnish Broadcasting Company
  Le Monde
  Premières Lignes
  Radio France
  iFact
  Deutsche Welle
  Norddeutscher Rundfunk
  Süddeutsche Zeitung
  Westdeutscher Rundfunk
  Ghana Business News
  Zami Reports
  Plaza Pública
  Contracorriente
  Stand News
  Direkt36
  Reykjavík Media
  Stundin
  The Indian Express
  Tempo
 Shomrim
  L'Espresso
  The Asahi Shimbun
  Kyodo News
  Arab Reporters for Investigative Journalism
  Africa Uncensored
  The Elephant
  Re:Baltica
  Daraj Media
  Daily Observer Newspaper
  FrontPage Africa
  Africa Report
  Siena.lt
  Reporter.lu
  Nation Publications LTD
  Platform for Investigative Journalism
  Malaysiakini
  Malian Network of Investigative Journalists
  Times of Malta
  L’Express 
  Proceso
  Quinto Elemento Lab
  MANS
  Le Desk
  The Namibian
  Centre for Investigative Journalism, Nepal
  Kantipur Daily
  Het Financieele Dagblad
  Platform Investico
  Trouw
  New Zealand Media and Entertainment
  TVNZ
  Confidencial
  L’Evenement
  Premium Times
  Aftenposten
  E24
  The News
  Grupo ABC Color
  Convoca
  IDL-Reporteros
  Philippine Center for Investigative Journalism
  Rappler
  Gazeta Wyborcza
  Expresso
  Centro De Periodismo Investigativo 
  RISE
  Important Stories
  Impact.sn
  KRIK
  OŠTRO
  amaBhungane Centre for Investigative Journalism
  Carte Blanche (M-Net)
  Newstapa
  El País
  LaSexta
  Spotify
  SVT
  TAMEDIA
  Jamii Media
  Isra News Agency
  De Cive (Le Citoyen) et La Lettre Agricole
  Flambeau des Democrates
  L’Union pour la Patrie
  Quoditien Liberte
  Inkyfada
  NMG Uganda
  
  BBC
  Finance Uncovered
  Private Eye
  The Guardian
  El Nuevo Herald
  Frontline (PBS)
  McClatchy
  Miami Herald
  The Washington Post
  Univision
  Semanario Búsqueda
  Armando.Info
  Makanday Center for Investigative Journalism

Reactions

Africa 
 : Prime Minister Patrick Achi’s office condemned the "malicious use" of information.
 : President Uhuru Kenyatta said the Pandora Papers would be good for transparency, and said he would respond fully when he returned from a trip abroad. He had previously demanded that all civil servants account for their wealth.

Asia 
 : President Gotabaya Rajapaksa has ordered the Bribery Commission to probe into Sri Lankans named in the Pandora Papers, which exposed financial fraud globally.
 : The Jordanian government called claims made about King Abdullah II in the leak "distorted", while the King himself denounced what he claimed was a "campaign against Jordan".
: The Indian Ministry of Finance promised an investigation into the revelations in the leak, and that appropriate legal action would be taken if necessary.
: Chief Executive Carrie Lam refused to comment on the report and whether the current government would follow up on the incident, saying only that the Hong Kong government has a "very robust" declaration of interests system. Leung Chun-ying, the former chief executive named in the document, pointed out that the relevant reports were misleading, claiming that only directly held shares need to be declared, and indirectly held and traded shares do not need to be declared, and he countered that the position of participating in the investigation was a "foreign agent".
: Coordinating Minister for the Economy Airlangga Hartarto and Coordinating Minister for Maritime Affairs and Investment Luhut Binsar Pandjaitan are named on the leak. Airlangga denied any knowledge of the transactions by the corporation he owned in the British Virgin Islands. Luhut denied partnership with an Indonesian state-owned oil firm then changed the company's name.
: Lebanese Prime Minister Najib Mikati and former Prime Minister Hassan Diab denied any wrongdoing.
: Prime Minister Imran Khan said that all citizens mentioned in the Pandora Papers would be investigated and appropriate action taken in case of wrongdoing. Ahsan Iqbal, secretary general of the Pakistan Muslim League (N), called for the resignation of Prime Minister Khan. 
: Prime Minister Anwar Ibrahim called for the content of the Pandora Papers to be discussed in Parliament after it was revealed several officials, including former finance minister Tengku Zafrul Aziz, as well as former finance minister Daim Zainuddin were named in the leaks. Subsequently in Parliament, Minister in the Prime Minister’s Department (Parliament and Law) Wan Junaidi Tuanku Jaafar said that the Government will instruct its agencies to look into claims related to the Papers. In addition, former Finance Minister Daim Zainuddin maintained his business dealings were legitimate.
: The Monetary Authority of Singapore (MAS) will examine information relating to one of the companies named in the report, a Singapore-based firm called Asiaciti Trust. The firm added that the reports were "based on incomplete and sometimes erroneous information", including some illegally obtained. Subsequently in Parliament, Minister for Finance Lawrence Wong said that no significant concerns on financial institutions in Singapore were raised by the leaks, although the MAS will engage institutions to see if there is a need to tighten controls. The two companies named in the report, including Trident Trust Company Singapore, are licensed and regulated.

Europe 
 : Former prime minister Tony Blair and his wife denied any wrongdoing, with the couple's spokesperson saying "the Blairs pay full tax on all their earnings. And have never used offshore schemes either to hide transactions or avoid tax.”
 : EU tax commissioner Paolo Gentiloni told the European Parliament that the European commission will present new legislative proposals to tackle tax avoidance and tax evasion by the end of the year.
 : The Czech National Police promised an investigation into any citizens mentioned in the Pandora Papers, including ex-Prime Minister Andrej Babiš. Babiš denied any wrongdoing, and alleged that the timing and/or content of the leak was aimed at influencing the upcoming legislative election.
: Tánaiste Leo Varadkar stated that the Irish government and legislature would move immediately to close any loopholes in tax or company law that allow individuals and businesses to use the country as an offshore location.
: President Putin's spokesman Dmitry Peskov dismissed the accusations against Putin, who is not directly named in the Pandora Papers, as "unsubstantiated claims" after several individuals linked to Putin were mentioned in the leak. Russian Foreign Ministry spokeswoman Maria Zakharova said that the United States was "the largest" tax haven and "billions of dollars in South Dakota belong to those accused of financial crimes." 
: President Volodymyr Zelensky's office denied any wrongdoing after he was named in the leak. Ex-journalist and Volodymyr Zelensky's associate  Serhiy Leshchenko said "there is no subject for a scandal" and "in Ukraine, offshore companies are so widespread that the owners of stalls already have an offshore company".

North America 
 : President Andrés Manuel López Obrador stated that he would push for an investigation into any Mexican nationals named in the leak.
 : The United States Department of State announced that it would review the documents published in the Pandora Papers. According to the leak, trusts in several U.S. states — including South Dakota, Florida, Delaware, Texas, and Nevada — were sheltering at least US$1 billion for offshore clients.

Central America and Caribbean  
: President Luis Abinader denied any wrongdoing after being named in the leak, adding that he "has been completely separated from the administration and management of all the companies controlled by the family, incorporated in the Dominican Republic or abroad" since he assumed power in August 2020.
 : The Procuraduría General de la Nación (PGN), a government agency, was reported to be analyzing the contents of the leak, seeking foundations for a criminal investigation of those mentioned in the leak. The Colegio Nacional de Abogados (CNA), a local trade association, stated that Panamanian law firms had offered their services lawfully, the leak does not reflect reality, threatens the rule according to higher law, law firms and their customers around the world enjoy confidentiality which may only be breached by a court order, and the leak poses a threat to Panamanian law firms as it presents them as allies of criminals. 
Alcogal, one of the largest sources of leaked documents, stated that many people named in the leak had never been its clients, the ICIJ had divulged inexact and outdated information and a wrong image of their law firm, already decided who was guilty, and Alcogal considers themselves part of the solution and are not infallible. The Panamanian government sent the ICIJ a letter through law firm Benesch, Friedlander, Coplan & Aronoff LLP, stating whatever image the ICIJ had of Panama in 2016 is out of date, and the Panamanian government is willing to start dialogue to avoid further great damage to Panama, as happened during the Panama Papers. The government argued that the name "Panama" became linked to offshore companies and money laundering due to efforts from the ICIJ, despite not being the main tax heaven or destination for tax structuring contrary to what the Tax Justice Network said, the ICIJ's use of "Panama Papers" caused global media to associate Panama with tax heavens, and listed measures the government had taken after the Panama Papers. They also announced the suspension of 50% of all companies registered in Panama, stated the aim to curb sensationalist coverage and counteract any negative consequences resulting from scandals where the country may be involved by others. The ICIJ was told to be cautious and avoid references to Panama without "informative justification". The government will supervise all subjects registered in Panama mentioned in the leak to protect the country's image and reputation through the newly created Superintendencia de Sujetos no Financieros, and the DGI will begin taxing procedures to all natural and juridical persons in the leak and is willing to exchange information with other jurisdictions. Alcogal, the Panamanian law firm protagonist of Pandora's papers, announced that it has created a transparency department in order to reinforce its obligations in the matter and its commitment to a regulation recently approved by the National Government.

South America 
 : President Sebastián Piñera denied having hidden assets in tax havens.
 : President Guillermo Lasso denied any wrongdoing. He said that he voluntarily cooperated with the Pandora Papers investigation, and that regarding his naming in the leak, "most of the societies mentioned were legally dissolved in the past, and I have no link with those that may still exist".
 : The National Secretariat for the Fight against Money Laundering and Terrorism Financing of the Presidential Office of Uruguay started ex officio to research on the case to find out about the roles of law firms based in Montevideo aimed to provide offshore entities to clients worldwide as intermediaries of Alcogal.

See also 

 List of people named in the Pandora Papers
 Azerbaijani Laundromat
 Bahamas Leaks
 Banca Privada d'Andorra
 Cyprus Papers
 Dubai Uncovered
 FinCEN Files
 The Laundromat (2019 film)
 LuxLeaks
 Mauritius Leaks
 Offshore Leaks
 Panama Papers
 Paradise Papers
 Russian Laundromat
 Swiss Leaks
 Suisse secrets

References

External links 

 "A Simple Guide to the Pandora Papers Leak" by BBC
 Pandora Papers at the International Consortium of Investigative Journalists

 
2021 in economics
2021 in international relations
2021 scandals
Bribery scandals
Data breaches
Data journalism
Email hacking
Finance fraud
Financial scandals
International Consortium of Investigative Journalists
Investigative journalism
Mining companies
Money laundering
News leaks
Offshore finance
Tax avoidance
Whistleblowing